The Challenger Tenis Club Argentino is a professional tennis tournament played on clay courts. It is currently part of the Association of Tennis Professionals (ATP) Challenger Tour. It is held in Buenos Aires, Argentina since 2022. The tournament was originally scheduled to be held in Villa Allende but was moved to Buenos Aires due to operational issues at the venue in Villa Allende.

Past finals

Singles

Doubles

References

ATP Challenger Tour
Clay court tennis tournaments
Tennis tournaments in Argentina
Sports competitions in Buenos Aires